The Keshet Cave (Rainbow Cave, also Qeshet Cave) is a natural arch on a ridge by the northern bank of Betzet Stream, Upper Galilee, Israel, in the area of the , in the Betzet Stream Nature Reserve, close to the border with Lebanon. It is a remnant of a large collapsed karst cave and is a narrow strip of rock overhanging a deep abyss.

Assessed from Route 8993, the cave is a tourists attraction. It also attracted the attention of rock climbers, and at the end of 2012 it was opened for sports climbing, however the climbing website 26crags.com had the info about the cave replaced with the notice that rock climbing was prohibited in the area.

References

Natural arches
Upper Galilee
Landforms of Northern District (Israel)